The Cann River is a perennial river located in the East Gippsland region of the Australian state of Victoria.

Course and features
The Cann River rises southwest of Granite Mountain in remote country on the eastern boundary of the Errinundra National Park and flows generally east, then south, then east, then south through the western edge of the Coopracambra National Park and through the Croajingolong National Park, joined by seventeen minor tributaries before reaching its mouth with Bass Strait, at the Tamboon Inlet in the Shire of East Gippsland. The river descends  over its  course.

A small portion of the catchment lies within New South Wales, most notably the Tennyson Creek sub-catchment.

See also

 List of rivers of Australia

References

External links
 
 
 

East Gippsland catchment
Rivers of Gippsland (region)
Croajingolong National Park